Baddest Guy Ever Liveth (abbreviated as BGEL) is the third studio album by Nigerian hip hop recording artist Olamide. It was released on November 7, 2013, by YBNL Nation. Olamide recorded the album between 2012 and 2013; he enlisted Pheelz, Buckwyla, Ketchup, Ice Prince, Pepenazi, Endia, Viktoh, B.Banks, Phyno, Pele Pele and Bez to appear as guest artists on it. The album was produced entirely by Pheelz, except for the thirteenth track "Sitting on the Throne".

Baddest Guy Ever Liveth was supported by four singles: "Durosoke", "Turn Up", "Yemi My Lover" and "Eleda Mi O". Premium Times newspaper included the album on its list of the 5 yet to be released Nigerian albums of 2013. It was ranked 12th on Afrikka Radio's list of the top 12 best Nigerian albums of 2013. Baddest Guy Ever Liveth won Best Album of the Year at the 2014 Nigeria Entertainment Awards, and was nominated for Rap Album of the Year at the 2014 City People Entertainment Awards. It won Best Rap Album and Album of the Year at The Headies 2014.

Background
Baddest Guy Ever Liveth was initially slated for release on October 14, 2013. However, it was postponed in order to support the release of Samklef's album. In a tweet, Olamide said, "Don't compete with your homies. Make money with your homies. Due to the respect and love I have for my homie Samklef, I'm holding my album back. Let's support Samklef." Olamide unveiled the Caesar-inspired album's cover art on October 17, 2013.

Composition
Baddest Guy Ever Liveth was recorded primarily in the Yoruba language. Olamide explores the depth of the Yoruba language by rapping in different variations of it. "Dope Money" contains Ijebu, a western Nigerian variation of Yoruba. Olamide incorporated elements, punch lines, and themes of Yoruba music onto the album. "Eleda Mi O" contains a blend of indigenous rap and Jùjú music. In "Esupofo", he is reminiscent of a commercial version of Da Grin. The track "Position Yourself" was recorded over a Makossa beat. The instrumental of "Gbadun Arawa" bears close resemblance to D'banj's "Mobolowowon".

Singles and other releases
The album's lead single "Durosoke" was released on May 1, 2013, along with "Baddest Nigga Ever Liveth", a freestyle recorded over Jay Z's "Dirt off Your Shoulder" instrumental. It was nominated for Song of the Year and Best Rap Single at The Headies 2013. The music video for "Durosoke" was directed by Clarence Peters and released exclusively on the Star Music platform. The album's second single "Turn Up" was released on July 4, 2013. Its music video was directed by Moe Musa and incorporates various clips of Olamide's performances on tour.

The album's third single "Yemi My Lover" was released on October 6, 2013. A writer for 360nobs applauded Olamide for his delivery and inclusion of Yoruba and Igbo slangs. The album's fourth single "Eleda Mi O" was released on January 3, 2014; its accompanying music video was photographed and directed by Unlimited L.A. On March 18, 2014, Olamide released music videos for "Anifowose" and "Sitting on the Throne". Shortly after the album's release, fans and colleagues mimicked the gunman pose seen on the album's cover.

Critical reception

Baddest Guy Ever Liveth received mixed reviews from music critics. InfoNubia.com praised Olamide's rhyming skills, but ended the review saying the album's tracks "sounded like freestyles that should probably stay on a mixtape." A writer for OkayAfrica said the album's "length doesn’t take away from it being a thoroughly enjoyable confirmation that success hasn’t dampened Olamide's fire." In a less enthusiastic review, Ayomide Tayo of Nigerian Entertainment Today awarded the album 3 stars out of 5, describing it as "a less inspired version of YBNL constructed by a rapper that is creatively low at the moment." Ogaga Sakpaide of TooXclusive also granted the album 3 stars out of 5, saying it is "packed with many fillers" like its predecessor and that its length "reduces the wow factor of the entire body of work." The Boiler Nation gave the album 3.5 stars out of 5 and felt it was a bit "overrated" when compared with his previous record. A writer for TayoTV gave the album 6.5 stars out of 10, saying it was "disorganized, noisy in some parts, lacked cohesion and freshness."

Accolades

Track listing

Samples
"Motivation" samples "Ghosts that We Knew", as performed by Mumford & Sons
"Anifowose" samples "Omo Anifowose", as performed by Wasiu Ayinde Marshall

Personnel 
The following people contributed to Baddest Guy Ever Liveth

Olamide Adedeji – primary artist
Phillip Kayode Moses – primary producer, featured artist
V.I.C – secondary producer
Panshak Zamani – featured artist  
Buckwyla – featured artist 
Ketchup – featured artist 
Opeyemi Gbenga Kayode – featured artist 
Endia – featured artist 
Viktoh – featured artist 
B.Banks – featured artist 
Azubuike Chibuzo Nelson – featured artist 
Pele Pele – featured artist 
Emmanuel Bez Idakula – featured artist

Release history

References

2013 albums
Olamide albums
Yoruba-language albums
Albums produced by Pheelz
YBNL Nation albums